East Belarus usually refers to the part of Belarus that was part of the Soviet Union between 1919 and 1939, as opposed to West Belarus that was part of the Second Polish Republic at that time.

The region was known as the Socialist Soviet Republic of Byelorussia in 1919 - 1920 and the Byelorussian Soviet Socialist Republic in 1920 - 1939.

In 1939 West Belarus was annexed by the USSR following the Soviet invasion of Poland and became part of the Byelorussian Soviet Socialist Republic.

Historical regions in Belarus
1920s in Belarus
1930s in Belarus